Chris Mottes is chief executive officer of Deadline Games, a games development group in Denmark. He is responsible for overseeing games like Chili Con Carnage. He started the games development group after running an underground television network with a friend.
His company's best selling game was Total Overdose which is made for Xbox, PS2 & Microsoft Windows, and were published by SCi games.

References

Living people
Danish chief executives
Year of birth missing (living people)